Joseph Edley (born 1947) is a professional Scrabble player and author, and the first player to win the National Scrabble Championship three times.

Pre-Scrabble life
Joe Edley grew up in Detroit, Michigan and attended Wayne State University, where he concentrated in mathematics and philosophy. In 1969, he moved to San Francisco, California, where he claims to have been influenced by the works of Jane Roberts. There, he gained the idea that simply from belief and doing all the proper practice and learning and maintaining that goal mentally, and keeping emotionally confident, that he could do it: he could manifest his desired reality. Realizing that he was a good game player and reading about the growth of the Scrabble tournament scene, he decided to manifest being a Scrabble champion.

Scrabble career
Having taken the job of a night security guard for the free time it afforded, Edley systematically memorized the first edition of the Official Scrabble Players Dictionary, a feat that only a small minority of top players have accomplished. He played in his first tournaments in California in 1978, performing well but not dominating. Edley has claimed that in preparing for his first national championship, the final key to his success was "controlling my breathing."

Edley won his first National Scrabble Championship in 1980 with a 14–3 record, half a game ahead of Jim Neuberger, although Neuberger had a much higher point spread (which would have been the tiebreaker.) He won additional National Championships in 1992 (22–5) and 2000 (22–9), and is the first player ever to win three National Scrabble Championships. He has also had some lackluster performances, finishing 23rd in both 1987 and 2002, and 17th in 1988. Edley has also never finished higher than third in a World Scrabble Championship, and posted 13–11 and 14–10 records in 1999 and 2001, his most recent World Scrabble Championships.

Since the beginning of his career in 1978, he has played at least 2,079 tournament games, winning about 68%, and earning at least $102,000 in prize money.

Edley was hired as an expert consultant for the National Scrabble Association and served as its Director of Clubs and Tournaments from 1988 to 2009.  He has published on Amazon.com: ANAGRAMMAR (2011), which is a puzzle book designed specifically to improve the average wordgame player's anagramming ability.   He published his first app, Nokori, a puzzle game that can be played by 5-year-olds or on its higher levels challenge Mensa members, late in 2015 and is currently working on a second version, Nokori Dragon (as of May 2016).

Controversy
Edley has drawn fire from many tournament Scrabble players for perceived conflicts of interest. As both a top-flight player and the holder of an administrative position, Edley is potentially in a position to influence the level of publicity other players receive, or to get away with minor rules violations. Many of these accusations were catalogued by expert Mike Baron in a 1996 multi-part post to the electronic mailing list Crossword-Games-Pro called "The Trial", and others have surfaced since. However, Edley still enjoys respect among many players for his playing success and for his efforts in helping the National Scrabble Association attract publicity, including co-authoring Everything Scrabble and writing The Official Scrabble Puzzle Book.

Works

References

External links

American Scrabble players
Living people
1947 births
Wayne State University alumni